"She Reminded Me of You" is a song recorded by American country music artist Mickey Gilley.  It was released in October 1988 as the second single from the album Chasin' Rainbows.  The song reached number 23 on the Billboard Hot Country Singles & Tracks chart.  The song was written by Peter McCann and Wayland Holyfield.

Chart performance

References

1988 songs
1988 singles
Songs written by Wayland Holyfield
Songs written by Peter McCann
Mickey Gilley songs
Song recordings produced by Norro Wilson